Bahramabad-e Qaqazan (also Romanized as Bahrāmābād-e Qāqāzān) is a village in Ilat-e Qaqazan-e Gharbi Rural District, Kuhin District, Qazvin County, Qazvin Province, Iran. At the 2006 census, its population was 640, in 128 families.

References 

Populated places in Qazvin County